The 1929 Virginia Cavaliers football team represented the University of Virginia as a member of the Southern Conference (SoCon) during the 1929 college football season. Led by first-year head coach Earl Abell, the Cavaliers compiled an overall record of 4–3–2 with a mark of 1–3–2 in conference play, placing 16th in the SoCon. The team played its games at Lambeth Field in Charlottesville, Virginia.

Schedule

References

Virginia
Virginia Cavaliers football seasons
Virginia Cavaliers football